David Catarina Suarez (born January 25, 1977) is a Filipino politician. He is the incumbent Representative of the 2nd District of Quezon in the House of Representatives of the Philippines. He previously served as governor of Quezon from 2010 to 2019, vice governor of Quezon from 2004 to 2007, and councilor of Unisan from 2001 to 2004.

Suarez is the youngest child of former Quezon Governor Danilo Suarez and former Quezon's 3rd District Representative Aleta Suarez.

Education
He attended the University of Asia and the Pacific where he attained a degree in Bachelor of Arts, specializing in Economics, Philosophy and Politics. He also had training in other educational institutes at the University of the Philippines Diliman, where he had a short course on Local Legislation and on Local Governance and Public Management. He also finished a training on Public Administration at the International Academy for Leadership in Gummersbach, Germany.

Political career
Suarez was elected as a Municipal Councilor of Unisan, Quezon, a post which he served from 2001–2004. He also served as Philippine Councilor's League Quezon Federation President, a post which he was elected to also from 2001–2004. From 2004–2007, Suarez governed Quezon province as the Vice Governor. At the Department of Environment and Natural Resources from 2007–2009, Suarez was Assistant Secretary who was tasked to oversee the River Basin Control Office while he also served as Program manager of the government body for South Luzon.

During the 2010 elections, Suarez was elected as Governor; he was re-elected in 2013 and in 2016. In 2018, he transferred his residence to Tiaong.

In 2019, he was elected representative of the 2nd district of Quezon. He was reelected in 2022 and re-joined Lakas–CMD ahead of the 19th Congress.

Awards
Galing Pook Award for "Quezon's 2in1" - given by the Galing Pook Foundation in 2014.
Galing Pook Award for "Lingap Kalusugan sa Barangay" also known as Health Coupon Program - given by the Galing Pook Foundation in 2014.
Most Outstanding Governor in the field of Social Services - given by the Association of Social Workers of the PHilippines in 2014.
Most Outstanding Governor in the field of Agriculture, Department of Agriculture.
Seal of Good House Keeping - awarded by DILG in 2011.
Outstanding LGU and Masigasig Award - given by the DOH - Center for Health and Development IV in 2011
Adopt a School Program Award - given by the Department of Education in 2012
Bukas Parangal ng Kagitingan - given by the National Disaster Risk Reduction Management Council in 2012.
Extra Mile Award - awarded by the Philippine Commission on Women and the Canadian Government in 2013 for empowering the institutionalizing Gender and Development in the Province.
GREAT Women Award - awarded by the Canadian Government in 2013

Personal life
He is married to ALONA Partylist Representative Anna Marie Villaraza-Suarez, with three children; Athalia Marie, Amalia Marie and David Sebastian.

References

Governors of Quezon
Living people
University of Asia and the Pacific alumni
1977 births
Members of the House of Representatives of the Philippines from Quezon
Nacionalista Party politicians
Lakas–CMD politicians